A Ton of Hits : The Very Best of Stock Aitken Waterman is a compilation album released in the UK in November 1990 bringing together the hits of Stock Aitken Waterman (SAW) in a continuously sequenced mix. It was released by Chrysalis Records on their subsidiary label Dover Records and followed the previous "Best of Stock Aitken Waterman" collections; The Hit Factory: The Best of Stock Aitken Waterman (Stylus Records, 1987), The Hit Factory Volume 2 (Fanfare/PWL Records, 1988) and The Hit Factory Volume 3 (Fanfare/PWL Records,1989). The album reached #7 in the compilation Top 20. Notably absent from this release are Bananarama and Dead or Alive, presumably due to licensing issues.

Track listing
(DOVER/PWL CCD 19)
81 CONTINUOUSLY SEQUENCED TRACKS

Disc one
Sealed With A Kiss -- Jason Donovan
Beyond Your Wildest Dreams -- Lonnie Gordon
Packjammed With The Party Posse -- Stock Aitken Waterman
Roadblock—Stock Aitken Waterman
After The Love Has Gone -- Princess
Say I'm Your Number One—Princess
New York Afternoon—Mondo Kane
Let's Get Together Tonite (You Wot!) -- Steve Walsh
No Fool (For Love) -- Hazell Dean
Wouldn't Change A Thing -- Kylie Minogue
Never Gonna Give You Up -- Rick Astley
Whenever You Need Somebody—Rick Astley
Can't Forget You -- Sonia
Together Forever—Rick Astley
They Say It's Gonna Rain—Hazell Dean
I Should Be So Lucky—Kylie Minogue
Cross My Broken Heart -- Sinitta
Got To Be Certain—Kylie Minogue
Je Ne Sais Pas Pourquoi—Kylie Minogue
That's The Way It Is -- Mel & Kim
Blame It On The Boogie -- Big Fun
Showin' Out (Get Fresh At The Weekend) -- Mel & Kim
When You Come Back To Me—Jason Donovan
Counting Every Minute—Sonia
Heartache -- Pepsi & Shirlie
Get Ready -- Carol Hitchcock
Every Day (I Love You More) -- Jason Donovan
I Only Wanna Be With You -- Samantha Fox
He Ain't No Competition -- Brother Beyond
You Think You're A Man -- Divine
I Haven't Stopped Dancing Yet—Pat & Mick
The Loco-motion—Kylie Minogue
Back In My Arms (Once Again) -- Hazell Dean
I'm So Beautiful—Divine
The Harder I Try—Brother Beyond
Whatever I Do (Wherever I Go) -- Hazell Dean
Tears On My Pillow—Kylie Minogue
Especially for You—Kylie Minogue & Jason Donovan
Ferry 'Cross The Mersey -- The Christians, Holly Johnson, Paul McCartney, Gerry Marsden & Stock Aitken Waterman
End Of The World—Sonia

Disc two
In The Heat Of A Passionate Moment—Princess
You'll Never Stop Me Loving You—Sonia
Never Too Late—Kylie Minogue
Better The Devil You Know—Kylie Minogue
I Don't Believe In Miracles—Sinitta
All Of Me (Boy Oh Boy) -- Sabrina
Take Me To Your Heart—Rick Astley
Maybe (We Should Call It A Day) -- Hazell Dean
Toy Boy—Sinitta
G.T.O. -- Sinitta
All The Way—England Football Team
Nothing Can Divide Us—Jason Donovan
Let's All Chant -- Pat & Mick
Hand On Your Heart—Kylie Minogue
S.S. Paparazzi—Stock Aitken Waterman
Success -- Sigue Sigue Sputnik
Love's About To Change My Heart (Edit) -- Donna Summer
Happenin' All Over Again (Hip House Radio Mix) -- Lonnie Gordon
Can't Shake The Feeling—Big Fun
Use It Up And Wear It Out—Pat & Mick
Love Is War -- Brilliant
Tell Me Tomorrow—Princess
The Heaven I Need -- The Three Degrees
Another Night—Jason Donovan
When Love Takes Over You (Remix) -- Donna Summer
Somebody—Brilliant
Rhythm Of The Rain—Jason Donovan
Turn It Into Love—Hazell Dean
I'll Keep On Loving You—Princess
My Arms Keep Missing You—Rick Astley
Hang On To Your Love—Jason Donovan
Who's Leaving Who—Hazell Dean
Nothing's Gonna Stop Me Now—Samantha Fox
Too Many Broken Hearts—Jason Donovan
F.L.M. -- Mel & Kim
Respectable—Mel & Kim
Just Don't Have The Heart -- Cliff Richard
Ain't Nothing But A House Party -- Phil Fearon
I'd Rather Jack -- The Reynolds Girls
Listen To Your Heart—Sonia
Handful Of Promises—Big Fun

See also
Mike Stock
List of songs that were written or produced by SAW (in chronological order, including US and UK chart positions)
The Hit Factory : The Best of Stock Aitken Waterman. (1987 UK compilation album released by Stylus Records).
The Hit Factory Volume 2. (1988 UK/Japan compilation album released by Fanfare Records and PWL Records.)
The Hit Factory Volume 3. (1989 compilation album released by Fanfare Records and PWL Records.)
The Hit Factory : Pete Waterman's Greatest Hits. (2000 compilation issued by Universal Music.)
Stock Aitken Waterman Gold. (2005 compilation released by PWL Records in association with Sony BMG).

Official Site
Mike Stock Music

1990 compilation albums
Albums produced by Stock Aitken Waterman
Chrysalis Records compilation albums